The Kama Sutra worm, also known as Blackworm, Nyxem, and Blackmal, is a type of malware (malicious software) that infects PCs using Microsoft Windows.

Discovered January 16, 2006, Kama Sutra was designed to destroy common files such as Microsoft Word, Excel, and PowerPoint documents when each computer's calendar hit February 3 and on the 3rd of each following month.

The worm arrived via e-mail, enticing computer users with promises of sexy pictures. The subject lines included "School girl fantasies gone bad", "Hot Movie", "Crazy illegal Sex!" and "Kama Sutra pics". When users clicked on the attachment, the machine became infected.  Once executed, the worm can corrupt and overwrite the most common Windows file types, .doc, .pdf, .zip, and .xls, among others; the data are changed and become unrecoverable.  The worm also tries to disable antivirus software.

See also
 Computer worm

References

External links
 CNN:Kama Sutra worm hits home
 Google Accidentally Sends Out Kama Sutra Worm
 Symantec Security alert

Computer worms